The 2014–15 Scottish Youth Cup was the 32nd season of the Scottish Youth Cup, the national knockout tournament at youth level organised by the Scottish Football Association for its full and associate member clubs. The tournament was for the under-20 age group, to complement current youth development strategies, having formerly been an under-19 competition. Players born after 1 January 1995 were eligible to play.

Celtic won the cup, defeating Rangers after a 5-2 win in the final.

Calendar

Format
The sixteen clubs who reached the fourth round of the 2013–14 competition receive a bye to the third round of this season's tournament. The remaining twenty eight clubs enter the first round and are initially divided into three regional groups to reduce travelling. The tournament becomes an all-in national competition from the third round onwards.

First round
The draw for the first and second rounds took place in July 2013.

Central Group

Two ties were drawn in this group with the following clubs receiving a bye to the second round:

Airdrieonians
Clyde
Dumbarton
Dundee
Dundee United
East Kilbride
Edinburgh City
Hamilton Academical
Livingston
Partick Thistle
Spartans
Whitehill Welfare

North Group

One tie was drawn in this group with all the following clubs receiving byes to the second round.
Aberdeen
Banks O'Dee
Brora Rangers
Clachnacuddin
Forfar Athletic
Fraserburgh
Huntly
Inverness Caledonian Thistle
Inverurie Loco Works
Keith
Lossiemouth
Montrose
Ross County

South Group

No first round ties were drawn in this group with all the following clubs receiving byes to the second round.
Annan Athletic
Dalbeattie Star
Selkirk
Threave Rovers

Second round

Central Group

North Group

South Group

Third round

The following sixteen clubs entered at this stage by virtue of having reached the fourth round of last season's competition:

Ayr United
Celtic
Cowdenbeath
Dunfermline Athletic
Formartine United
Greenock Morton
Heart of Midlothian
Hibernian
Kilmarnock
Motherwell
Queen of the South
Queen's Park
Raith Rovers
Rangers
St Johnstone
St Mirren

The third round draw was announced on 6 October 2014.

Fourth round
The draw for the fourth round took place on 26 November 2014 with ties played on 7 December 2014

Quarter-finals

Semi-finals
The ties for the semi finals were played on 3 and 7 May 2015.

Final

External links
Youth Cup on Scottish FA website
Results on archive.org

References

5
Scottish Youth Cup seasons